The  was one of the five routes of the Edo period and it was built to connect Edo (modern-day Tokyo) with the temple-shrine complex of the Mangan-ji and Tōshōsha (now called the Rinnō-ji and Tōshōgū), which are located in the present-day city of Nikkō, Tochigi Prefecture, Japan. It was an ancient path that became formalised when power moved to Edo, and was established fully in 1617 by Tokugawa Hidetada, to give safer access to the temple-shrine mausoleum of his father, the first shogun Tokugawa Ieyasu, who was buried there that year. With only twenty-one stations, the Nikkō Kaidō was the shortest of the five routes, and it shares seventeen stations with the Ōshū Kaidō. Its route can be traced with Japan's National Route 4 and National Route 119.

Stations of the Nikkō Kaidō
The 21 stations of the Nikkō Kaidō are listed below in order and are divided by their modern-day prefecture. The present day municipality is listed afterwards in parentheses.

Tokyo

Starting Location: Nihonbashi (日本橋) (Chūō-ku)
1. Senju-shuku (千住宿) (Adachi-ku) (also part of the Mito Kaidō)

Saitama Prefecture
2. Sōka-shuku (草加宿) (Sōka)
3. Koshigaya-shuku (越ヶ谷宿) (Koshigaya)
4. Kasukabe-shuku (粕壁宿) (Kasukabe)
5. Sugito-shuku (杉戸宿) (Sugito, Kitakatsushika District)
6. Satte-shuku (幸手宿) (Satte)
7. Kurihashi-shuku (栗橋宿) (Kuki)

Ibaraki Prefecture
8. Nakada-shuku (中田宿) (Koga)
9. Koga-shuku (古河宿) (Koga)

Tochigi Prefecture
10. Nogi-shuku (野木宿) (Nogi, Shimotsuga District)
11. Mamada-shuku (間々田宿) (Oyama)
12. Oyama-shuku (小山宿) (Oyama)
13. Shinden-shuku (新田宿) (Oyama)
14. Koganei-shuku (小金井宿) (Shimotsuke)
15. Ishibashi-shuku (石橋宿) (Shimotsuke)
16. Suzumenomiya-shuku (雀宮宿) (Utsunomiya)
17. Utsunomiya-shuku (宇都宮宿) (Utsunomiya)
18. Tokujirō-shuku (徳次郎宿) (Utsunomiya)
19. Ōzawa-shuku (大沢宿) (Nikkō)
20. Imaichi-shuku (今市宿) (Nikkō) (also part of the Nikkō Reiheishi Kaidō)
21. Hatsuishi-shuku (鉢石宿) (Nikkō)
Ending Location: Nikkō Shinkyō (bridge) (日光神橋) (Nikkō)

See also
Edo Five Routes
Tōkaidō (or 53 Stations of the Tōkaidō)
Nakasendō (or 69 Stations of the Nakasendō)
Kōshū Kaidō
Ōshū Kaidō
Other Routes
Nikkō Onari Kaidō
Nikkō Reiheishi Kaidō
Nikkō Wakiōkan

References

Road transport in Japan
1610s establishments in Japan